Run Away Mr. Perle (French title La Fugue de Monsieur Perle) is a French comedy film from 1952, directed by Pierre Gaspard-Huit, written by Loïc Le Gouriadec, starring Noël-Noël and featuring Louis de Funès.

Cast 
 Noël-Noël: Monsieur Bernard Perle (the baker)
 Arlette Poirier: Maud (the allegedly suicidal woman)
 Marie Glory: Juliette Perle (Bernard's wife)
 Gaston Orbal: Norbert (Juliet's cousin, the freeloader)
 Simone Paris: Béatrice Dupont-Vallier (the man who suffers with amnesia)
 Jean Galland: Doctor Briquet (the psychiatrist)
 Jean Toulout: Adrien Bontoux
 Paul Amiot: the police inspector
 Paul Faivre: the coffeehouse keeper in Meung-sur-Loire
 Jean Barrère: the medical assistant 
 Paul Ville: the postman
 Eugène Yvernes: Joseph Corbin (the notary)
 Marcel Rouze: a regular of the bistro in Meung-sur-Loire
 Jean Daurand: the cleaner of tiles of the psychiatric hospital
 Marcel Delaitre: the bistro keeper in Romainville
 Georgette Anys: the wife of the bistro keeper in Romainville
 Sophie Mallet: the housemaid working for the parish
 Charles Lemontier: the doctor
 Luce Fabiole: Mrs Fournier
 Louis de Funès: the crazy guy trying to catch fish in a wash-bowl

References

External links 
 
 La Fugue de Monsieur Perle (1952) at the Films de France

1952 films
French comedy films
1950s French-language films
French black-and-white films
Films directed by Pierre Gaspard-Huit
1952 comedy films
1950s French films